Shobhana Ranade (born 26 October 1924) is an Indian social worker and Gandhian, known for her services towards her cause of destitute women and children. The Government of India honoured her in 2011, with the Padma Bhushan—the third highest civilian award—for her services to the society.

Biography

Ranade was born in 1924, Poona, in the Bombay Presidency. The turning point in her life came in 1942, when she was 18, when she met Mahatma Gandhi at the Aga Khan Palace, in Poona, which resulted in the young Shobhana taking up Gandhian ideals for the rest of her life.

Ranade's life was devoted to the cause of destitute women and children. Her social career took a turn, in 1955, when she went to North Lakhimpur, Assam, joining a padyatra (walkathon) with Vinobha Bhave and helped setting up the Maitreyee Ashram and a Shishu Niketan, the first child welfare centre in the region. She also started the campaign, Adim Jaati Seva Sangh, a program for imparting training to Naga women on charkha weaving.

In 1979, she returned to Pune and helped founding the Gandhi National Memorial Society and an institute for women for training, based at Aga Khan Palace.

In 1998, Ranade, under the aegis of the Gandhi National Memorial Society, established the Kasturba Mahila Khadi Gramodyog Vidyalaya, an institute for destitute women, for training them in 20 village trades and skills.

She started an SOS children's village in Maharashtra, under the name, Balgram Maharashtra which has now grown to provide a home to 1600 orphans. The Hermann Gmeiner Social Centre, founded by Ranade and situated at Shivajinagar, Pune, is a children's home dedicated to the rehabilitation and education of street children, caring for 112 boys and 138 girls.

Another child welfare project was the Balgriha and Balsadan, established by Ranade at Saswad, in Pune. These centres now provide home to 60 destitute girls. Ranade was also involved with the Save Ganga Movement, drive to save River Ganges from pollution, through Gandhi National Memorial Society

Ranade lives in Pune, taking care of her activities centred on Aga Khan Palace.

Career positions held
 Trustee – Kasturba Gandhi National Memorial Trust (KGNMT)
 Trustee – Gandhi Smarak Nidhi
 Trustee – Balgram Maharashtra
 Secretary – Gandhi National Memorial Society
 Chairperson – All India Committee of Eradication of Illiteracy among Women (AICEIW)
 Board member – SOS Children's Villages – Delhi
 President – All India Women's Conference
 Chairperson – Bhoodan Gram Dan Board of Maharashtra

Awards and honours
 Padma Bhushan – 2010
 Jamnalal Bajaj Award – 2011
 Reliance Foundation – CNN IBN Real Heroes 2012 Life Time Achievement Award
 Rabindranath Tagore Prize
 Rajeev Gandhi Manav Seva Award – 2007
 Pride of Pune Award – Pune University
 National Award for Child Welfare Work – 1983
 Mahatma Gandhi Award

See also

 Gandhi Smarak Nidhi

References

Further reading
 

Social workers
Recipients of the Padma Bhushan in social work
Gandhians
People from Pune
1924 births
Living people
Activists from Maharashtra
20th-century Indian educators
Indian women philanthropists
Indian philanthropists
20th-century Indian women
Women Indian independence activists
Indian independence activists from Maharashtra
Women educators from Maharashtra
Educators from Maharashtra
Social workers from Maharashtra
20th-century women educators